National Secondary Route 121, or just Route 121 (or ) is a National Road Route of Costa Rica, located in the San José province.

Description
In San José province the route covers Escazú canton (San Rafael district), Mora canton (Colón district), Santa Ana canton (Santa Ana, Uruca, Piedades districts).

References

Highways in Costa Rica